Lauren Kathage is an Australian politician who is the current member for the district of Yan Yean in the Victorian Legislative Assembly. She is a member of the Labor Party and was elected in the 2022 state election, after replacing retiring MLA Danielle Green.

Kathage was born in South Australia and grew up in Queensland. She then worked in the Northern Territory before moving to Victoria with her husband. Kathage spent 15 years as a community worker in Australia and Internationally, leading housing and homelessness projects. Before her election to parliament, Kathage managed multimillion dollar programs to train healthcare workers, improve income generation opportunities for regional communities and to boost the school attendance rates of children with disabilities.

References 

Year of birth missing (living people)
Living people
Members of the Victorian Legislative Assembly
21st-century Australian politicians
21st-century Australian women politicians
Australian Labor Party members of the Parliament of Victoria
Women members of the Victorian Legislative Assembly